Is the 2010–11 Gimnàstic de Tarragona season. The club plays in two tournaments: the Segunda División and the Copa del Rey.

Squad

Youth squad 
Youth players with first team experience

Player statistics

Squad stats 
Last updated on 8 June 2011.

|}

Pre-season

Ciutat de Tarragona Trophy

Season results

Segunda División

With Luis César Sampedro

With Joan Carles Oliva

Copa del Rey

Second Qualifying Round

Goalscorers

Transfers

In

Out

Results

Segunda División

Results summary

References 

2010–11 in Catalan football
Spanish football clubs 2010–11 season
Gimnàstic de Tarragona seasons